Malcolm Clarke Stewart (14 March 1935 – 19 March 1977) was an Australian racing driver. He was known as the "Jolly Green Giant" for his disposition and height.

Stewart was born in Orange, New South Wales. He began his motorsport career racing motorcycles, being selected to represent Australia at the 1955 Isle of Man TT, but withdrew due to work commitments. After racing Karts and touring cars he moved to open wheelers in 1965 with much success, winning the 1967 and 1968 Australian One and a Half Litre Championships. Stewart was selected to drive for Alec Mildren Racing, and went on to win the 1969 and 1970 Australian Formula 2 Championships driving a 1.6-litre Mildren Waggott. In 1970 he competed in a 2-litre Mildren Waggott in which he ran strongly in the 1970 Tasman Series with a number of podiums, and finished second to Jackie Stewart in the 1970 JAF Grand Prix for Formula Libre cars. He also won the 1971 Australian Drivers' Championship and the 1972 Singapore Grand Prix.

Stewart later raced a Lola T330, winning the 1974 Australian Drivers' Championship and the 1974 Australian Grand Prix. He then developed an initially troublesome Lola T400, winning the 1975 Australian Grand Prix and the 1975 Toby Lee Series. He led the 1976 Australian Grand Prix from Vern Schuppan and John Goss until he retired a few laps from the end.

Max Stewart lost his life on 19 March 1977 in an accident while practicing at Calder Park Raceway, Victoria.

Career results

References

1935 births
1977 deaths
Accidental deaths in Victoria (Australia)
Australian Formula 2 drivers
People from the Central West (New South Wales)
Racing drivers from New South Wales
Racing drivers who died while racing
Sport deaths in Australia